Little Lucid Moments is the twelfth full-length studio album by the Norwegian band Motorpsycho that was released on March 31, 2008, by Rune Grammofon Records in Scandinavia, the UK, the United States and France and on March 28, 2008, by Stickman Records in Germany and the rest of Europe. It is available on CD and double vinyl. The four songs featured on the album are extremely long, each between 11 and 21 minutes. 

This was the first album recorded with new drummer Kenneth Kapstad. It was once again co-produced by long-time collaborateur Helge Sten aka Deathprod.

As with most Motorpsycho albums the cover art was created by Kim Hiorthøy

Track listing
 Suite: Little Lucid Moments (21:05)
 Lawned (Consciousness Causes Collapse) (6:10)(Sæther) 
 A Hoof to the Head (4:19)(Ryan/Sæther) 
 Hallucifuge (Hyperrealistically Speaking...) (9:18)(Kapstad/Ryan/Sæther) 
 Sweet Oblivion / Perfect Sense (1:14) (Ryan/Sæther) 
 Year Zero (a damage report) (11:26) (Ryan) 
 She Left on the Sun Ship (14:25) Featuring Confusion is Kjeks & (I think) I Feel Better Now...(Kapstad/Ryan/Sæther) 
 The Alchemyst (12:27) a discourse on transmutation, pennies dropping & the luminiferous aether (Sæther)

Personnel
Bent Sæther: vocals, bass guitar, guitars, keyboards etc.
Hans Magnus Ryan: guitars, vocals, keyboards etc.
Kenneth Kapstad: drums

References

2008 albums
Motorpsycho albums